Shapour Marhaba (born 1957) is an Iranian politician. Marhaba was elected from the Astara electoral district to the 4th, 5th (By-election) and 7th Iranian legislative elections.

Biography 
Shapour Marhaba's brother Yosuf Marhaba was assassinated by the Mujahedin on 22 August 1981 while he was prosecutor of Astara. After this Shapour was also targeted in an assassination plot on 29 August 1981 when he was a key member of Astara's IRGC, but he survived. Marhaba was then elected three times to represent the city.

Marhaba was:
 President of the Iran–Georgia Friendship Group,
 President of the Iran–Bulgaria Friendship Group,
 Vice President of the Iran–Azerbaijan Friendship Group, and
 Vice President of the Iran–Romania Friendship Group in the Iranian Parliament.

Shapour Marhaba was banned by the Council of Guardians from taking part in the 2012 and 2016 Iranian legislative elections.

Electoral history

Books 
 Report to the honorable people of Astara
 Plan of Astara Free Trade – Industrial Zone
 Astara port: Survey of social, cultural and economic situation
 3rd workbook of Shapour Marhaba: Report of three years activity at the 7th Iranian parliament
 Interior Policy and Foreign Policy of Azerbaijan Republic during the presidency of Heydar Aliyev

Notes

References 
 drmarhaba.ir

External links 
 Islamic Consultative Assembly Periods Deputies Association

People from Astara, Iran
Deputies of Astara, Iran
1957 births
Members of the 4th Islamic Consultative Assembly
Members of the 5th Islamic Consultative Assembly
Members of the 7th Islamic Consultative Assembly
Living people
Islamic Revolutionary Guard Corps personnel of the Iran–Iraq War